Roger Aaron Brown (born June 12, 1949) is an American character actor known for his role as Deputy Chief Joe Noland on the hit CBS drama television series The District from 2000 to 2004, and for his minor role in the 1988 science fiction film Alien Nation.

Career 
Brown appears in the first two episodes of the TNT television series Saving Grace as the Chief of Detectives, as well as portraying Colonel Joseph Ntila in the 4th episode of the 6th season of House M.D.. Brown has made a number of appearances in many films especially Caravan Pictures. He portrayed John Henry in Disney's Tall Tale (1995). Other roles include Star Trek: The Motion Picture (1979), Cobra (1986), Near Dark (1987), Action Jackson (1988), Downtown (1990), and RoboCop 2 (1990).

He also provided the voice of Achilles Davenport in the 2012 video game, Assassin's Creed III. He reprised the role, albeit as a much younger version of the character, in 2014's prequel Assassin's Creed Rogue. Brown alsovoiced Dr. Imran Zere in the 2015 survival-horror game, Dying Light.

Filmography

Film

Television

Video games

References

External links

1949 births
Living people
American male film actors
Male actors from Washington, D.C.
African-American male actors
American male television actors
20th-century American male actors
21st-century American male actors
20th-century African-American people
21st-century African-American people